The Zamość Zoo (Polish: Ogród Zoologiczny w Zamościu) is a zoological garden located in the city of Zamość, Lublin Voivodeship in Poland. It was established in 1918 and currently contains 2524 animals and 312 species covering the area of approximately 13 hectares. The zoo is a member of the European Association of Zoos and Aquaria.

History
The Zamość Zoo was established in 1918 at the initiative of Stefan Miler, a teacher of the Jan Zamoyski Boys' High School. It is considered one of the oldest zoological gardens in Poland. Initially, it was located in the Old Town. In the 1920s, the zoo acquired more animals including snakes, turtles and birds. An aviary was also built in that period of the zoo's history. In 1924, the city authorities designated 0,84 hectares of land for the purposes of expanding the zoo as more and more people started to visit it. In 1927, the zoo was visited by the then-President of Poland Ignacy Mościcki. In 1931, the first lion was transported to the Zamość Zoo. In 1933, Stefan Miller, the director of the zoo, was awarded the Cross of Independence for his contributions to the education of the youth. After the World War II, in 1953, the zoo was officially named the City Zoological Garden (Polish: Miejski Ogród Zoologiczny). In 1980, the zoo was transferred to its current location at 12 Szczebrzeska Street. In the following years, two new pavilions were constructed in the zoo - the monkeys house and the pavilion for fish and reptiles. In 2002, the owls and dingos enclosures were built. Between 2007 and 2013, further modernisation took place at the zoo.

Currently, visitors to the Zamość Zoo can see such animals as llamas, lions, bears, giraffes, tigers, hippopotamuses, camels, donkeys, capybaras, lynxes, zebras, tapirs, porcupines, bat-eared foxes, gibbons, squirrel monkeys, macaques, pygmy marmosets, armadillos, crocodiles, iguanas, snakes, pythons, knob-billed ducks, storks, crested partridges, galahs, emus, Victoria crowned pigeons, Northern bald ibises, tawny owls, peacocks and many more.

List of directors
Stefan Miler (1919-1957)
Tomasz Grabowski (1957-1963)
Andrzej Jarkowski (1963-1968)
Jerzy Tomaszewski (1968-1972)
Czesława Leszczyńska (1972-1999)
Jadwiga Stoczkowska (1999-2006)
Grzegorz Garbuz (2006–present)

Gallery

See also
Warsaw Zoo
Wrocław Zoo
Poznań Zoo
Kraków Zoo

References

Zoos in Poland
1918 establishments in Poland
Zoos established in 1918
Zoo